Kumari is a village development committee in Nuwakot District in the Bagmati Zone of central Nepal. At the time of the 1991 Nepal census it had a population of 6458 people living in 1132 individual households.

Clinic

The Sukman Medical Polyclinic was built by the Health and Ed 4 Nepal non-profit, which provides ongoing support.  The clinic was severely damaged by the 23 April 2015 earthquake that struck Nepal but remains in partial operation.

Schools

The local pre-secondary school, Shree Bikash, was also severely damaged in the 23 April 2015 earthquake and its remains were demolished.  Re-building of the school began in November 2015 via funding sourced by the non-profits Trekking for Kids and Health and Ed 4 Nepal.

References

External links
 UN map of the municipalities of Nuwakot District

Populated places in Nuwakot District